Louis XIV is a 2005 designer board game by Rüdiger Dorn. Players take on roles of members of the court of Louis XIV of France. The game won the 2005 Deutscher Spiele Preis.

External links

Board games about history
Cultural depictions of Louis XIV
Deutscher Spiele Preis winners
Rio Grande Games games
Board games introduced in 2005